is a former Japanese football player.

Club statistics

References

External links

1984 births
Living people
Juntendo University alumni
Association football people from Saitama Prefecture
Japanese footballers
J1 League players
J2 League players
Mito HollyHock players
Thespakusatsu Gunma players
FC Gifu players
Montedio Yamagata players
Association football defenders